Choi Yu-jin (Hangul: 최유진; born August 12, 2000) is a South Korean figure skater. She is the 2016 Merano Cup silver medalist.

Career
Choi placed 8th with a score of 136.47 in a Korean domestic competition to select skaters for the ISU Junior Grand Prix (JGP). She made her JGP debut in Riga, Latvia, placing 8th with a total score of 141.33 points. In November 2015, she won the junior gold medal at the Golden Bear of Zagreb in Croatia.

Choi's first senior international medal, silver, came in November 2016 at the Merano Cup in Italy.

Programs

Competitive highlights
CS: Challenger Series; JGP: Junior Grand Prix

Detailed results

References

External links
 

2000 births
Living people
South Korean female single skaters
Sportspeople from Gyeonggi Province